Brendan Jeremiah O'Sullivan (born 1979) is an Irish former Gaelic footballer. He played for club side Adrigole, divisional side Beara and at inter-county level with the Cork senior football team.

Honours
Adrigole
Cork Junior Football Championship: 2006
Beara Junior Football Championship: 1998, 1999, 2000, 2001, 2002, 2004, 2005, 2006

Beara
Cork Senior Football Championship: 1997

Cork
Munster Senior Football Championship: 1999, 2002
National Football League: 1998–99

References

1999 births
Living people
Adrigole Gaelic footballers
Beara Gaelic footballers
Cork inter-county Gaelic footballers
Irish international rules football players
Irish schoolteachers